As one of the United States's more significant seaports, there is a long tradition of fireboats in Baltimore.
When Baltimore added the diesel powered fireboat Mayor Thomas D'Alesandro, Jr., in 1956, she joined a fleet of older steam-powered fireboats, some of which had been launched in the 19th century.  She was Baltimore's first new fireboat in 35 years.

References

Fireboats of Maryland
Firefighting in Maryland
Water transportation in Maryland
Government of Baltimore